The 1955 Villanova Wildcats football team represented the Villanova University during the 1955 college football season. The head coach was Frank Reagan, coaching his second season with the Wildcats. The team played their home games at Villanova Stadium in Villanova, Pennsylvania.

Schedule

References

Villanova
Villanova Wildcats football seasons
Villanova Wildcats football